The Slovenia men's national under-18 and under-19 basketball team represents Slovenia in international under-18 and under-19 (under age 18 and under age 19) competitions. It is organized and run by the Basketball Federation of Slovenia (Košarkarska zveza Slovenije).

Competitive record

FIBA U18 European Championship

FIBA Under-19 Basketball World Cup

See also
 Slovenia men's national basketball team
 Slovenia men's national under-20 basketball team
 Slovenia men's national under-17 basketball team
 Slovenia women's national under-19 basketball team

References

External links
Official website 
FIBA profile
Archived records of Slovenia team participations

under
Men's national under-18 basketball teams
Men's national under-19 basketball teams